Oberea rufiventris is a species of beetle in the family Cerambycidae. It was described by Per Olof Christopher Aurivillius in 1914. It is known from Borneo.

References

Beetles described in 1914
rufiventris